A Fazenda 5 was the fifth season of the Brazilian reality television series A Fazenda which premiered Tuesday, May 29, 2012, at 10:30 p.m. on RecordTV.

The season was officially confirmed since 2011 as part of a millionaire contract between Strix Television and Record, which guaranteed seasons until 2019.

Britto Junior and Chris Couto reprised their hosting stints for the show. Celso Cavallini made his debut as the show's new special correspondent, replacing Tina Roma.

The grand prize was of R$2 million without tax allowances.

Production

Overview
Pre-production started in January 2012. At first, the fifth season was scheduled to premiere early April but was postponed to mid June since the producers believed that launching the new season right after the finale of Big Brother Brasil 12 could hurt the show due to the similarities in both formats.

On May 9, 2012, it was announced that the season would premiere May 30, 2012 in order to make way for the 2012 Summer Olympics and to avoid clashing with Globo's new 11 pm soap opera Gabriela. On 15 May, it was announced that the premiere was anticipated to May 29, 2012.

Contestants
The complete cast list was leaked 24 hours before the season premiere.
Biographical information according to Record official series site, plus footnoted additions.
(ages stated are at time of contest)

Future appearances
In 2015, Viviane Araújo appeared in Dança dos Famosos 12, she won the competition.

In 2016, Gretchen appeared with her husband Carlos Marques in Power Couple Brasil 1, they finished in 5th place in the competition.

In 2017, Sylvinho Blau-Blau appeared with his wife Ana Paula Pereira in Power Couple Brasil 2, they finished in 6th place in the competition.

In 2017, Nicole Bahls returned to compete in A Fazenda 9, she finished in 16th place in the competition.

In 2018, Rodrigo Capella appeared in Dancing Brasil 3, he finished in 4th place in the competition.

In 2019, Nicole Bahls appeared with her husband Marcelo Bimbi in Power Couple Brasil 4, they originally finished in 8th place, however they comeback to the game and finished as winners from the competition.

In 2021, Viviane Araújo appeared in Dança dos Famosos 18, in a all stars season, she finished in 4th place in the competition.

In 2022, Gretchen appeared as a Rosa (Rose) in The Masked Singer Brasil 2, she joined Group A and sang only one song before her unmasking at the first episode, placing last at 16th in the competition.

In 2023, Sylvinho Blau-Blau appeared in a trio called Os Suculentos (The Succulents), along with Patrícia Marx and Rosana in The Masked Singer Brasil 3, they joined Group A and sang four songs before their unmasking at the sixth episode, placing 9th in the competition.

Format
The format changed from previous seasons. Celebrities contestants were incarcerated in the Farm with no contact to and from the outside world.
Each week, the contestants took part in several compulsory challenges that determined who would win power in the Farm. The Farmer of the Week is immune from nominations.

Key Power
Starting on week 2, the contestants compete to win the Key Power. The Key Power holder is the only contestant who can open the mystery box located at the Farm. However, opening the box will unleash a good consequence or a bad consequence at the nomination process. The Key Holder's choice is in bold.
Results

Guest
On day 20, production pitched a catch for the participants with help of Théo Becker, one of the most controversial housemates from A Fazenda seasons. Théo acted as if he was a new contestant, but at the end of day 21, he revealed that it was a joke and left the farm.

Voting history

Notes

Ratings and reception

Brazilian ratings
All numbers are in points and provided by Kantar Ibope Media.

References

External links
 Official Site 

2012 Brazilian television seasons
A Fazenda